A tradwife (a neologism for traditional wife or traditional housewife), in recent western culture, typically denotes a woman who believes in traditional sex roles and a traditional marriage. Many tradwives believe that a woman does not lose rights by choosing to take a traditional role in marriage. Some may choose to leave careers to focus instead on family and meeting their family's needs. A high profile example of this is Canadian Cynthia Loewen, a former Miss Canada, who abandoned plans to pursue a medical degree in order to be a full-time housewife. She stated that she finds fulfillment from the arrangement of her husband as the breadwinner and her in charge of the home, and that she is "more happy as a result".  

According to Google Trends, online searches of the term "tradwife" began to rise in popularity around mid 2018. Tradwife aesthetic has since spread throughout the internet in part through social media, particularly YouTube and Instagram, featuring women extolling the virtues of behaving as the ideal woman.

Tradwife Aesthetic 
For some women who identify as tradwives, submitting to a husband means putting him in charge of all of the family's finances, with the wife getting a spending allowance. Alena Pettitt felt "alienated" growing up in the 1990s, and didn't like the sentiment of "let's fight the boys and go out and be independent and break glass ceilings", and instead she related to the TV shows of the 1950s and 1960s. She explained:

A report in America magazine, a Catholic publication, has also reported that some tradwife adherents have adopted the practice of wearing veils–a practice embraced by some Catholic women as a means of reverence and empowerment–to increase their attractiveness to men who fetishize veils.

Criticism of Tradwives 
The tradwife aesthetic is criticized due to associations in the United States and Britain with the alt-right and white nationalism and critics often stipulate that tradwives are a version of what feminists describe as "toxic feminity", or, internalized sexism. Critics claim this is a tactic used by male alt-right adherents to recruit more women to far-right causes. In her 2019 book, Latter-Day Screens: Gender, Sexuality, and Mediated Mormonism, Brenda R. Weber uses the term toxic femininity to describe the need to conform to rigid female gender roles due to social pressure, reinforced through (sometimes unconscious) beliefs, such as viewing oneself as unworthy, and imperatives to be consistently pleasant, accommodating, and compliant. According to Weber, such beliefs and expectations  there is no a priori female self" apart from the needs and desires of men and boys. Weber associates these norms with "usually white, mostly middle-class, relentlessly heterosexual, and typically politically conservative" expectations of femininity. 

In 2018, New York Times columnist Annie Kelly discussed parallels between tradwives and white supremacy and its urging of white women to reproduce more white infants (i.e., those of European-Germanic descent) due to a declining birthrate. While declining birthrate is based on evidence from national censuses in specific western areas (e.g., United States, Canada, and the United Kingdom), academic Robert Pape has suggests that far-right exploitation of these demographics reinforces a long held conspiracy theory dubbed the "Great Replacement theory", also known as "White genocide". José Pedro Zúquete noted that far-right extremists reinforce the Zionist Occupation Government, an antisemitic conspiracy theory, as a way to explain the white demographic decline in the United States as well.

Katha Pollitt also linked anxiety of white demographic decline with white support for anti-abortion causes in her 2015 book, Pro. Additionally, scholar Monica Toft states that decades of white demographic decline, combined with a serious decline in public education standards, has led to unwarranted nostalgia and openness to conspiracy theories."

In fact, Seyward Darby discussed the onset of the tradwife aesthetic in her 2020 book, Sisters in Hate: American Women and White Extremism, depicted through interviews with women who self-identify as traditional. Darby depicts three women's personal views of the tradwife aesthetic, as well as providing observations and evidence of the interviewees' advocacy for tenants of the USian political far-right, including white supremacy, antisemitism, and other ultraconservative beliefs. One of those interviewed in Darby's book is noted to have declared that her “primary duty is having children and supporting her husband."

While those who follow the tradwife aesthetic suggest that it is simply rejection of feminism in favor of a return to the simpler times of the 1950s and patriarchal family systems, one feminist notes that it is feminism which allows women to choose between housewifery or a career to begin with:I say this knowing how lucky I am to be a housewife in 2015 as opposed to 1955. Would I be enjoying it so much without washing machines, dishwashers, supermarkets or disposable nappies? Definitely not. My love of the job has nothing to do with a nostalgia for a past in which, for a start, my lifestyle was inconceivable, and women were going silently mad in their impeccably dusted homes. I can enjoy being a homechief without a supply of Valium precisely because I know it doesn’t have to be forever.Hephzibah Anderson, writing in Prospect, has described the tradwife aesthetic as a "fringe, but frankly creepy" development.

See also
Barefoot and pregnant
Be fruitful and multiply
Campaign for the Feminine Woman
 Culture of Domesticity
 Gone Girl (novel)
 Kinder, Küche, Kirche
 Natalism
 Separate spheres
The Stepford Wives
League of German Girls

References

External links

2010s neologisms
Conservatism
Criticism of feminism
Gender-related prejudices
Internet memes introduced in the 2010s
Natalist terminology
Personifications
Sexism
Stereotypes of upper class women
Social media campaigns
Women-related neologisms